The Episkopon (Greek: ΕΠΙΣΚΟΠΩΝ, "bishop") is a secret society at Trinity College in the University of Toronto, which has been active since 1858 when its male branch was founded. The 225th reading of its original male branch was held in 2011. The female branch of Episkopon had been active since 1899, holding their 182nd Reading in 2019. Prominent alumni of the Episkopon include Former Canadian Minister of Foreign Affairs Bill Graham, filmmaker Atom Egoyan, and Former Canadian Governor General Adrienne Clarkson. The organization is one of the oldest collegiate secret societies in North America and the oldest in Canada.

The male and female branches both present three annual Readings during which they publicly satirized the goings-on about college through a wide range of jokes, songs, and poems delivered by the branch's leader, the Scribe. The society's mythological premise is to deliver "gentle chastisement" on behalf of the Venerable Father (or Mother) Episkopon, a spirit who supposedly resided at Trinity and who was represented at Readings by a human skull. Described in the media as a "self-perpetuating board of directors", the clandestine group of former Scribes and their assisting editors style themselves as the Order of the Golden Key. The motto of the organization is from Horace: Notandi Sunt Tibi Mores (Latin: "The manners of men are to be carefully observed").

In 1992, Episkopon was censured and disassociated from the Trinity College Council following allegations of racism and homophobia. Despite policies prohibiting Episkopon from engaging in any activities on College property, the society nevertheless continues to play an important role in undergraduate life at Trinity.

History
Episkopon was founded in 1858, when it was announced that the first Scribe was Pakenham Edward Stewart, later an Anglican priest. Episkopon began as a student newspaper, developed into a form in which only one copy of each edition was created, to be read aloud by the Scribe. Episkopon provides insight into College history, through the keeping of archives dating back to 1879. A poster by artist Roloff Beny advertising a Reading from 1945 is in possession of the National Archives of Canada. Also in the National Archives is a film about the former Trinity College campus on Queen Street West, made by Gordon Sparling, in which Episkopon's traditions feature prominently. A board listing the names of female Scribes once hung in Trinity's St. Hilda's College, but was removed upon the group's decision to disassociate from the College, a show of solidarity with the male branch in the 1990s. 

On June 3, 2020, the female branch of Episkopon announced its dissolution, following renewed controversy on social media about its problematic past. Although the male branch is rumoured to have dissolved as well, there has been no public acknowledgement of this.

Controversy
One attempted student suicide was allegedly linked to a 1985 reading, although the circumstances of the connection were not reported, and were later refuted by a CBC radio investigation. In October 1991, following accusations of racism, sexism, and homophobia in Episkopon, a task force was formed to investigate it and Trinity College at large. When the male Scribe of the 1992-1993 academic year refused to draft a constitution that was consistent with the task force's recommendations, the Trinity College Council voted unanimously to sever all ties with the organization. Investigative journalist Declan Hill, a Trinity alumnus, in a 1993 documentary broadcast on the CBC Radio program Ideas, claimed that Episkopon's Readings tended to ridicule certain groups and actions as a form of social control. The article cited student objections to the singling out of individuals for public shaming. In 2008, a prospective male member of Episkopon sustained head injuries when he tripped and fell down a hill during an initiation ritual.

References 

Student organizations in Canada
Collegiate secret societies
University of Toronto
Student organizations established in 1858